In enzymology, a guanylate kinase is an enzyme that catalyzes the chemical reaction

ATP + GMP  ADP + GDP

Thus, the two substrates of this enzyme are ATP and GMP, whereas its two products are ADP and GDP.

This enzyme belongs to the family of transferases, specifically those transferring phosphorus-containing groups (phosphotransferases) with a phosphate group as acceptor.  This enzyme participates in purine metabolism.

Guanylate kinase catalyzes the ATP-dependent phosphorylation of GMP into GDP. It is essential for recycling GMP and indirectly, cGMP. In prokaryotes (such as Escherichia coli), lower eukaryotes (such as yeast) and in vertebrates, GK is a highly conserved monomeric protein of about 200 amino acids. GK has been shown to be structurally similar to protein A57R (or SalG2R) from various strains of Vaccinia virus.
Systems biology analyses carried out by the team of Andreas Dräger also identified a pivotal role of this enzyme in the replication of SARS-CoV-2 within the human airways.

Nomenclature 
The systematic name of this enzyme class is ATP:(d)GMP phosphotransferase. Other names in common use include"
 deoxyguanylate kinase, 
 5'-GMP kinase, 
 GMP kinase, 
 guanosine monophosphate kinase, and 
 ATP:GMP phosphotransferase.

References

Further reading 

 
 
 
 
 

EC 2.7.4
Enzymes of known structure
Protein domains